An astronomical constant is any of several physical constants used in astronomy. Formal sets of constants, along with recommended values, have been defined by the International Astronomical Union (IAU) several times: in 1964 and in 1976 (with an update in 1994). In 2009 the IAU adopted a new current set, and recognizing that new observations and techniques continuously provide better values for these constants, they decided to not fix these values, but have the Working Group on Numerical Standards continuously maintain a set of Current Best Estimates. The set of constants is widely reproduced in publications such as the Astronomical Almanac of the United States Naval Observatory and HM Nautical Almanac Office.

Besides the IAU list of units and constants, also the International Earth Rotation and Reference Systems Service defines constants relevant to the orientation and rotation of the Earth, in its technical notes.

The IAU system of constants defines a system of astronomical units for length, mass and time (in fact, several such systems), and also includes constants such as the speed of light and the constant of gravitation which allow transformations between astronomical units and SI units. Slightly different values for the constants are obtained depending on the frame of reference used. Values quoted in barycentric dynamical time (TDB) or equivalent time scales such as the Teph of the Jet Propulsion Laboratory ephemerides represent the mean values that would be measured by an observer on the Earth's surface (strictly, on the surface of the geoid) over a long period of time. The IAU also recommends values in SI units, which are the values which would be measured (in proper length and proper time) by an observer at the barycentre of the Solar System: these are obtained by the following transformations:

Astronomical system of units 

The astronomical unit of time is a time interval of one day (D) of 86400 seconds. The astronomical unit of mass is the mass of the Sun (S). The astronomical unit of length is that length (A) for which the Gaussian gravitational constant (k) takes the value  when the units of measurement are the astronomical units of length, mass and time.

Table of astronomical constants

Notes
* The theories of precession and nutation have advanced since 1976, and these also affect the definition of the ecliptic. The values here are appropriate for the older theories, but additional constants are required for current models.

† The definitions of these derived constants have been taken from the references cited, but the values have been recalculated to take account of the more precise values of the primary constants cited in the table.

References 

"2015 Selected Astronomical Constants

External links 
 Tables of constants — from Nick Strobel's Astronomy Notes
 Astronomical constants index — James Q. Jacobs

Physical constants
Constants
Constant